F.A.M.E. is the third studio album by Colombian singer and songwriter Maluma. Released through Sony Latin on 18 May 2018, the title is an acronym for Fe, Alma, Música, Esencia. The album was supported by two singles: "Corazón" and "El Préstamo". It also includes the song "Felices los 4". In order to promote the album, Maluma went on the F.A.M.E. Tour in 2018.  The album is also Maluma's first trilingual album, containing songs that are written and sung in Spanish, English, and Portuguese.

The album debuted at number 37 on the US Billboard 200, number 1 on the Top Latin Albums and number 1 on the Latin Rhythm Albums chart with first week sales of 15,000 equivalent album units earned. The album won the Latin Grammy Award for Best Contemporary Pop Vocal Album at the Latin Grammy Awards of 2018.

Promotion

Singles 
On 21 April 2017, the album's lead single, "Felices los 4", was released digitally on music stores and streaming services. A notable salsa version of the song featuring American singer Marc Anthony was released on 7 July 2017. The song peaked at number 48 on the US Billboard Hot 100 and at number two on the US Billboard Hot Latin Songs chart.

"Corazón" was released digitally on music stores and streaming services on 3 November 2017, as the album's second single. The song peaked at number 87 on the US Billboard Hot 100 and at number five on the US Billboard Hot Latin Songs chart.

"El Préstamo" was released digitally on music stores and streaming services on 9 March 2018, as the album's third single. The song peaked at number eight on the US Billboard Bubbling Under Hot 100 songs chart and at number ten on the US Billboard Hot Latin Songs chart.

Promotional singles
On 24 November 2017, Maluma released three promotional singles: "GPS", "Vitamina" and "23". Two of the songs, "GPS" and "Vitamina" charted on the Hot Latin Songs chart where they peaked at number 35 and 49 respectively. Despite the success of the tracks, they were all excluded from the final release of the album. On 4 May 2018, Maluma released the song "Marinero" as the album's fourth promotional single along with a music video to support it. The song peaked at number 27 on the Hot Latin Songs chart.

Short film
On November 23, 2017, Maluma released a 26-minute-long short film in promotion of the album, directed by Jessy Terrero, who also directed the music videos for "Felices los 4", "Corazón" and "El Préstamo". Named X, it features songs such as "Cuatro Babys" featuring Noriel, Bryant Myers, and Juhn, "GPS" featuring French Montana, "Vitamina" featuring Arcángel, and "23". The latter three of which at the time were promotional singles for the album.

Track listing
Song titles adapted from Amazon and songwriting credits taken from Tidal

Charts

Weekly charts

Year-end charts

Certifications

Release history

References

2018 albums
Maluma albums
Sony Music Latin albums
Spanish-language albums
Latin Grammy Award for Best Contemporary Pop Vocal Album